Liu Huanqi (1928 - 2014) was a military officer in the People's Liberation Army Air Force of China. He was awarded the rank of lieutenant general in 1988.

Biography
Born in Qingyuan County, Hebei in 1928, Liu Huanqi joined the People's Liberation Army in 1946, and he joined the Communist Party of China the following year. After graduating from PLA Air Force Aviation University in 1951 he took part in the Korean War, the Communist government commissioned him as battalion chief of PVA Air Force Flight Brigade. He shot down two American F-86s. After war he held various positions in the PLA Air Force, including vice chief of staff of Jinan Military Region and deputy commander of its Air Force. Liu died of an illness in Jinan, Shandong, on November 4, 2014.

References

1928 births
2014 deaths
Chinese Korean War pilots
Chinese military personnel of the Korean War
People's Liberation Army Air Force generals
People's Liberation Army generals from Hebei
People from Baoding
PLA Air Force Aviation University alumni